Kəpənəkçi (also, Kapanachkhi and Kyapyanyakchi) is a village and municipality in the Zaqatala Rayon of Azerbaijan.  It has a population of 965.

References 

Populated places in Zaqatala District